Lake County may refer to:

New Zealand
 Lake County, New Zealand

United States
 Lake County, California
 Lake County, Colorado
 Lake County, Florida
 Lake County, Illinois
 Lake County, Indiana
 Lake County, Michigan
 Lake County, Minnesota
 Lake County, Montana
 Lake County, Ohio
 Lake County, Oregon
 Lake County, South Dakota
 Lake County, Tennessee

See also
 Lake (disambiguation)
 Lake and Peninsula Borough, Alaska
 Lake Township (disambiguation)
 Lake of the Woods County, Minnesota
 Bear Lake County, Idaho
 Oceana County, Michigan
 Green Lake County, Wisconsin
 Red Lake County, Minnesota
 Salt Lake County, Utah